Burnham 'Burnie' Gill is a Canadian former international lawn bowler.

Gill won the pairs silver medal at the 1980 World Outdoor Bowls Championship in Frankston, Victoria with bowls partner Graham Jarvis.

References

Canadian male bowls players